Flemish Eye is a record label started in 2003 in Calgary, Alberta, Canada by Ian Russell. The first release was Infiniheart by Chad VanGaalen, which was picked up in 2005 by indie label Sub Pop. From the success of Infiniheart, the label has earnestly developed a mandate of assisting Calgary-based musicians and artists. Through the release of Women's self-titled album, the label has also developed a working relationship with Bloomington, Indiana-based independent label Jagjaguwar. The label was referred to by CMJ New Music Monthly as a "micro-indie."

The name Flemish Eye originates from the type of fishing knot by this name, used when attaching hooks, rings and swivels to wire, but can also be used to rig a loop on heavy mono line.

Artists 
 Blessed
 The Besnard Lakes
 Dana Gavanski
 Yves Jarvis
 N0V3L
 Preoccupations
 Chad VanGaalen
 Women

Alumni artists 
 The Avulsions
 Black Mold
 Braids
 The Cape May
 Jennifer Castle
 Ghostkeeper
 Health

Discography
 046: Chad VanGaalen : World's Most Stressed Out Gardener (CD/LP)
 045: The Besnard Lakes : The Besnard Lakes Are The Last of the Great Thunderstorm Warnings (CD/LP)
 044: Blessed : iii (CD/12" EP)
 043: Women : Rarities 2007-2010 (12" EP)
 042: Yves Jarvis : Sundry Rock Song Stock (CD/LP)
 041: Dana Gavanski : Wind Songs (LP)
 040: Dana Gavanski : Yesterday Is Gone (CD/LP)
 039: Yves Jarvis : The Same But by Different Means (CD/LP)
 038: N0V3L : NOVEL (LP)
 037: Preoccupations : New Material (CD/LP/Tape)
 036: The Avulsions : Expanding Program (LP)
 035: Chad VanGaalen : Light Information (CD/LP/Tape)
 034: Yves Jarvis : Good Will Come to You (LP)
 033: The Avulsions/Mauno : Mauno/The Avulsions Split 7" (7" Single)
 032: Preoccupations : Preoccupations (CD/LP)
 031: Braids : Companion (12" EP)
 030: Braids : Deep in the Iris (CD/LP/Digital)
 029: Preoccupations (as Viet Cong) : Viet Cong (CD/LP/Digital)
 028: Preoccupations : Cassette (12" EP)
 027: Chad VanGaalen : Shrink Dust (CD/LP/Digital) 
 026: Braids : Flourish // Perish (CD/LP/Digital)
 025: Braids : In Kind // Amends (12" EP)
 024: Chad VanGaalen : Diaper Island (CD/LP)
 023: Jennifer Castle : Castlemusic (CD/LP)
 022: Braids : Native Speaker (CD/LP)
 021: Women : Public Strain (CD/LP)
 020: Ghostkeeper : Ghostkeeper (CD/LP)
 019: Black Mold : Snow Blindness Is Crystal Antz (CD/LP)
 018: Pale Air Singers : Pale Air Singers (CD)
 017: Chad VanGaalen : Soft Airplane (CD/LP)
 016: Women : Women (CD/LP)
 015: Health : "Heaven" 12" Single + RMXs (12")
 014: The Cape May : Glass Mountain Roads (CD)
 013: Chad VanGaalen : Skelliconnection (CD/LP)
 012: The Cape May : Central City May Rise Again (CD)
 011: Chad VanGaalen : Infiniheart (CD/LP)

See also 
 List of record labels

References

External links
 Official site

Canadian independent record labels
Record labels established in 2003
Indie rock record labels
Alternative rock record labels